The year 1992 in television involved some significant events. Below is a list of television-related events during 1992.

Events

Television programs

Debuts

Returning this year

Ending this year

Entering syndication this year
A list of programs (current or canceled) that have accumulated enough episodes (between 65 and 100) or seasons (3 or more) to be eligible for off-network syndication and/or basic cable runs.

Changes of network affiliation
The following shows aired new episodes on a different network than previous first-run episodes:

Made-for-TV movies and miniseries

Television stations

Sign-ons

Network affiliation changes

Births

Deaths

See also
 1992 in the United States
 List of American films of 1992

References

External links 
List of 1992 American television series at IMDb

 
1990s in American television